William Schwartz (born 6 May 1933) is an American law professor and corporate director. He graduated magna cum laude in 1955 with a J.D. from the Boston University School of Law.. He died on December 20, 2017.

He was professor of law at Boston University from 1955 to 1991, and Dean of the Boston University School of Law from 1980 to 1988. He was Vice President for Academic Affairs (Chief Academic Officer) at Yeshiva University between 1993 and 1998, and still serves as Professor of property law at the Cardozo School of Law at Yeshiva. He was a professor of Law at Boston University, and a faculty member at the Frances Glessner Lee Institute of the  Harvard Medical School. He became the first honorary member of the National College of Probate Judges, was a member of the Legal Advisory Board of the New York Stock Exchange, and has served in the Office of Public Information of the United Nations.

He has been a corporate director of Viacom since 2006, having served for Former Viacom since 1987. He has been counsel in the New York office of Cadwalader, Wickersham & Taft in New York City since 1988, where he concentrates on trusts and estates, business law and family law.

References

External links
Viacom - Board of Directors 
Yeshiva University - William Schwartz

Cardozo School of Law faculty
Living people
1933 births
20th-century American Jews
American lawyers
20th-century American businesspeople
People associated with Cadwalader, Wickersham & Taft
Boston University School of Law alumni
American legal scholars
21st-century American Jews